The 1952 Bowling Green Falcons football team was an American football team that represented Bowling Green State University in the Mid-American Conference (MAC) during the 1952 college football season. In their 12th season under head coach Robert Whittaker, the Falcons compiled a 7–2 record (2–2 against MAC opponents), finished in fourth place in the MAC, and outscored all opponents by a combined total of 257 to 155.

The team's statistical leaders were Bill Lyons with 915 passing yards, and Fred Durig with 858 rushing yards, and Jim Ladd with 632 receiving yards. Darrell Clay was the team captain. Fullback Fred Durig received the team's Most Valuable Player award.

Schedule

References

Bowling Green
Bowling Green Falcons football seasons
Bowling Green Falcons football